Mosan may refer to:
 any attribute of the Meuse (river) or Meuse valley area
 Mosan languages
 Mosan art
 Malin Moström, Swedish footballer
 Mosan, Iran (disambiguation), places in Iran